William E. Hartnett (December 4, 1919 – July 21, 2002) was an American lawyer and politician.

Hartnett was born in Chicago, Illinois. He served in the United States Army during World War II and was a pilot. Hartnett graduated from the University of Virginia School of Law in 1947. He practiced law in Waukegan, Illinois and Woodstock, Illinois. Hartnett also served as an attorney for the National Labor Relations Board in St. Louis, Missouri.  Hartnett was involved in the Democratic Party and was involved with the labor union movement. In 1952, he ran for the United States House of Representatives and lost the election. Hartnett served in the Illinois House of Representatives in 1965 and 1966. In 1970, he ran for the Illinois Supreme Court and lost the election. In 1986, Hartnett moved with wife to Lake Geneva, Wisconsin. He died at his home in Lake Geneva, Wisconsin from heart failure.

Notes

1919 births
2002 deaths
Lawyers from St. Louis
Lawyers from Chicago
Politicians from Chicago
People from Waukegan, Illinois
People from Woodstock, Illinois
People from Lake Geneva, Wisconsin
Military personnel from Illinois
University of Virginia School of Law alumni
Democratic Party members of the Illinois House of Representatives
National Labor Relations Board officials
United States Army personnel of World War II